Barlow Girls' High School is a higher secondary school located at Ramakrishna Mission Road, Makdumpur, Malda, West Bengal, India. It was established in 1871 by Uma Roy.

Notable alumni
 Subhamita Banerjee- Bengali singer from Malda, India, who specializes in modern songs, Ghazals. She has many Bengali albums to her credit and is one of the well known singers in the Bengali music industry.

References 

Girls' schools in West Bengal
High schools and secondary schools in West Bengal
Schools in Malda district
Educational institutions established in 1871
1871 establishments in India